D 85, also known as Baniyas Road, is a road in Dubai, United Arab Emirates.  The road begins near the north end of the Deira Corniche, and runs beside Dubai Creek south-eastwards. Passing important landmarks along the creek, D 85 ends near the Dubai Creek Golf & Yacht Club.

Important landmarks along the D 85 route include the Hyatt Regency Dubai on the Deira Corniche, the Deira Twin Towers, Al Nasr Square, Etisalat Tower 1, Dubai Municipality, and the Deira City Centre.  D 85 intersects with other roads to provide access to Bur Dubai — it intersects with D 92 (Al Mina Road/Al Khaleej Road) near Port Rashid to form the Al Shindagha Tunnel and with Umm Hurair Road in Deira to form the Al Maktoum Bridge.

The word Baniyas is a reference to the dynastic tribe of the Al Maktoums.

Roads in the United Arab Emirates
Transport in Dubai